The Edith Borthwick School is a mixed special school located in Braintree, Essex, England. It has 246 pupils from ages 3 to 19, with severe and complex learning difficulties including autism.

History
The school was first opened in 1976 in purpose-built premises in nearby Bocking, where it neighboured Bocking Church Street Primary School, but moved in 2015 to its current purpose-built premises in Braintree.

The school is  named after Edith Borthwick, an Essex County Councillor who died in a traffic accident in the 1970s and who "did a lot for special education".

Fire 
In April 2007 a fire broke out at the school's former site. Two demountable classrooms burned down, in addition to a garage. The cause of the fire was later thought to be arson.

Controversy 
In March 2019, a UNISON survey of the school's support staff highlighted concerns over the amount of violence at the school. Many of the 22 staff members surveyed reported that they have been assaulted by pupils and some suffered serious injuries as a result, including concussions and dislocated joints. The survey showed there is also concern that the school's bosses are not managing and logging such incidents appropriately.

References

External links

Ofsted report 2014
Government "Compare school and college performance" data
 Photographs of the former school premises, now empty

Special schools in Essex
Braintree, Essex
Educational institutions established in 1976
1976 establishments in England
Community schools in Essex